A Sister to Assist 'Er is a 1938 British comedy film directed by George Dewhurst and Widgey R. Newman and starring Muriel George, Polly Emery and Charles Paton. It was based on the play A Sister to Assist 'Er by John le Breton.

Cast
 Muriel George as  Mrs. May / Mrs. le Browning 
 Polly Emery as  Mrs. Getch 
 Charles Paton as  Mr. Harris 
 Billy Percy as  Alf 
 Harry Herbert as Mr. Getch 
 Dorothy Vernon as  Mrs. Thistlethwaite 
 Dora Levis as  Mrs. Hawkes 
 Elsie Shelton as  Miss Pilbeam

References

External links

1938 films
British comedy films
Films directed by George Dewhurst
British films based on plays
1938 comedy films
Films directed by Widgey R. Newman
British black-and-white films
Quota quickies
Films shot at Station Road Studios, Elstree
1930s English-language films
1930s British films